Farès Chaïbi (born 28 November 2002) is a French-born Algerian professional footballer who plays as a midfielder for Toulouse.

Club career 
Chaïbi came trough the youth academy of FC Lyon, before joining the Toulouse FC in 2019, where he signed his first professional contract in February 2022.

During the following pre-season, Chaïbi was one of the standout players of the friendly games, proving to be decisive against the likes of Nîmes or the Real Sociedad, finishing this preparation with three goals and two assists.

He made his professional debut on 7 August 2022, starting for Toulouse during their first game back in Ligue 1, a 1–1 draw against OGC Nice.

International career
Born in France, Chaïbi has changed his allegiance to Algeria in March 2023. He was called up to a training camp for the Algeria U20s in October 2020.

Personal life
Farès Chaïbi is the younger brother of Ilyes Chaïbi who is also a professional footballer.

References

External links
 
 

2002 births
Living people
Footballers from Lyon
French sportspeople of Algerian descent
French footballers
Association football midfielders
Ligue 1 players
Toulouse FC players